Victoria is a barrio in the municipality of Aguadilla, Puerto Rico. Its population in 2010 was 1,790. Victoria barrio is part of the Aguadilla urban zone.

History
A lot of sugar cane was grown in Victoria in the 19th century.

Puerto Rico was ceded by Spain in the aftermath of the Spanish–American War under the terms of the Treaty of Paris of 1898 and became an unincorporated territory of the United States. In 1899, the United States Department of War conducted a census of Puerto Rico finding that the population of Victoria barrio was 716.

Features
Victoria has an elevation of 338 feet. The José de Diego School is located in Victoria. , a summit with an elevation of 676 feet, is located in Victoria.

Sectors
Barrios (which are roughly comparable to minor civil divisions) in turn are further subdivided into smaller local populated place areas/units called sectores (sectors in English). The types of sectores may vary, from normally sector to urbanización to reparto to barriada to residencial, among others.

The following sectors are in Victoria barrio:

.

See also

 List of communities in Puerto Rico
 List of barrios and sectors of Aguadilla, Puerto Rico

References

External links

Barrios of Aguadilla, Puerto Rico